Jay-Jay Feeney (previously Jay-Jay Harvey; born 28 March 1974) is a radio host on More FM's drive show, Jay-Jay & Flynny Driving You Home, with Paul Flynn. She has spent the majority of her career at The Edge, mostly on its breakfast show, until she left in December 2017.

Early life 
Feeney was born Jacqulyn-Joanne Barbara Feeney on 28 March 1974, to Robynne Andersen. She was born in Auckland, as the result of a brief fling. Her mother Robynne married Gary Feeney who brought her up as his own daughter even though Robynne and Gary separated when Jay-Jay was just four years old. 
When she was 37 she found her birth father on Facebook. Since meeting him, she has acquired 5 more half-siblings. She now has ten siblings in total.
She grew up in Hamilton and New Plymouth but moved around frequently due to an unsettled home life. Her mum's next partner was very abusive and controlling. 
She changed her name via Deed Poll in 2014 from Jacqulyn-Joanne to Jay-Jay.

Career
Feeney began her radio career doing six weeks of work experience at Energy FM in New Plymouth at the age of 15. Over the next two years, she helped out with station promotions. At one point, she donated $50 to charity to go on air with Heemi Hill on Radio Taranaki for half an hour, and ended up staying on air for four hours. She left school at the end of sixth form and studied towards a certificate in Media Studies at Taranaki Polytechnic, while continuing to work at Energy FM; she had her first on-air break in February 1991, when the usual 1 am – 7 am weekend host didn't show up. She was later given the Monday-Friday midnight – 6 am shift, then a couple of weeks later, promoted to 7 pm – midnight.

In 1994, she moved to The Breeze in Hamilton, where she hosted the drive show. She then left four months later, to host the drive show (2 pm – 7 pm) on the new station The Edge, where she started on air on 26 September 1994. In May 1995, she moved to host breakfast (6 am – 10 am) with Malcolm Paul, and drive (10 am – 2 pm) by herself. 

In 2015, she appeared in the sixth series of Dancing with the Stars, where she placed fourth.  In 2017, Feeney left The Edge after hosting for 23 years, with her last day on air being 22 December 2017.

In April 2018, she began on More FM, hosting the drive show, Jase & Jay-Jay Driving You Home, with Jason Gunn. Paul "Flynny" Flynn joined the show in May 2019, which became Jay-Jay, Flynny & Jase Driving You Home. Gunn subsequently left the show, and it is now known as Jay-Jay & Flynny Driving You Home.

Honors and awards
Feeney won her first two radio awards, for Best Individual Air Personality, in 1995 and 1996. In 2012, the show won Best Morning Show at the New Zealand Radio Awards. In 2014, Feeney hosted the New Zealand Radio Awards and the show won Best Morning Show, The Sir Paul Holmes Broadcaster of the Year award, and the 'Blackie' award (named in honor of broadcaster Kevin Black). In 2018, she received a New Zealand Radio Award for Outstanding Contribution to Radio.

Works
In 2013 she published an autobiographical book about her struggle with fertility, Misconception: A True Story of Life, Love and Infertility. In 2016 she published a memoir, Life on the Edge.

Personal life
Feeney married co-host Dominic Harvey in 2004. They became Legal Guardians of Feeney's nephew, Seven, in 2007. Seven lived with them until the guardianship expired in 2017. 

She changed her name to Harvey in 2014 as a ten year anniversary gift to her husband Dominic Harvey, before changing it back to Feeney early 2018. In 2017, Feeney and Harvey announced their separation and she reverted to her surname of Feeney.

References

New Zealand radio presenters
New Zealand women radio presenters
Living people
1974 births
The Edge (radio station)
More FM
New Zealand autobiographers
New Zealand women writers